is a Buddhist temple in the town of Kamiichi, Toyama Prefecture, Japan. The temple belongs to the Shingon sect of Japanese Buddhism. It is more popularly known by the name of  after its main image.

History 
The temple claims to have been founded in 725 AD by the wandering priest/miracle-worker Gyōki, who carved a 2.8 meter statue of Fudō Myō-ō in bas-relief on a tuff cliff-face. While there are no historical records to back up this claim, the carving itself dates from the late Heian period and is a designated Important Cultural Property in 1974. The latter two statues may have been added at a later date. The Fudō Myō-ō is 2.8 meters high and remains in good very preservation as it have been protected by a building for most of history. The temple was connected with worship of the sacred mountain Mount Tateyama and at one point had 21 subsidiaries and 60 chapels. The Fudō-dō was destroyed by a windstorm in 1335, by a fire set by troops of the Uesugi clan during the late Muromachi period and again by a tree in 1967.

In 1930, the carvings were designated a National Historic Site of Japan in 1934. The temple's Sanmon and three-story pagoda are important cultural properties of Kamiichi town. The temple also has a waterfall which flows in six streams, which is used by practitioners of Shugendō for ritual purification.

See also
List of Historic Sites of Japan (Toyama)

References

External links 

 Kamiichi town official site 
Toyama tourist information 

Shingon temples
Buddhist temples in Toyama Prefecture
Kamiichi, Toyama
Historic Sites of Japan
History of Toyama Prefecture
Important Cultural Properties of Japan
Shugendō
8th-century establishments in Japan
Etchū Province